The 2016 Louisiana Democratic presidential primary took place on March 5 in the U.S. state of Louisiana as one of the Democratic Party's primaries ahead of the 2016 presidential election.

On the same day, Democratic primaries were held in Kansas and in Nebraska, while the Republican Party held primaries in four states, including their own Louisiana primary.

Clinton won every parish in the state except for Cameron and LaSalle Parishes.

Opinion polling

Results
Clinton dominated in Louisiana winning all but two of the states parishes. Clinton was declared the winner in Louisiana right when the polls closed.

Results by parish

Analysis
A state Hillary Clinton lost solidly to Barack Obama in 2008, she progressed to victory in 2016. With its heavily African American population, Hillary Clinton solidly defeated Bernie Sanders in Louisiana. The electorate in Louisiana was expected to be about half African American, as it was about 48% African American in 2008. Clinton won overwhelmingly in the major cities of New Orleans, Baton Rouge, Lafayette, and Shreveport, all with significant minority populations. Clinton also did well in the areas north of New Orleans and east of Baton Rouge in the 1st Congressional District, which is among the most conservative in Louisiana and the South at large. She also performed well in rural counties in Central Louisiana and those along the Louisiana-Texas border that are majority white as she had likewise done eight years prior.

See also
 2016 Louisiana Republican presidential primary

References

Louisiana
Democratic primary
2016